Weathermaker Music is the record label owned by the American rock band Clutch and their manager Jack Flanagan. Weathermaker Music LLC was formed in June 2008. Weathermaker Music was mostly known to work with Clutch and their side project, the psychedelic jazz-rock alter ego The Bakerton Group.

History 
In 2012, Weathermaker signed and released product by The Company Band and The Mob. Both groups include Weathermaker Music principal owners. On March 19, 2013 Weathermaker Music released the Clutch record "Earth Rocker" on CD and vinyl. At the end of 2013 Weathermaker Music released "Earth Rocker Live" which is a double 12 inch vinyl picture disc version of the "Earth Rocker" studio release on one LP, and the same track listing recorded live from various cities on their 2013 US tour on the second LP. In 2013 Weathermaker Music signed Deep Swell, featuring Clutch member Tim Sult on guitar. Their record, "Lore of the Angler" was released October 15, 2013. Weathermaker Music signed the Maryland-based group Lionize in 2013 as well. Entitled "Jetpack Soundtrack", this Lionize record was released on February 18, 2014 in North America, April 11, 2014 in Europe, and February 14, 2014 in the UK. The Lionize signing marks the label's first signing of an independent artist to Weathermaker Music.

In the summer of 2014, Weathermaker Music completed the Earth Rocker release cycle with a very special Double Vinyl 12" Picture Disc for collectors and released "Earth Rocker Deluxe", a 2xCD / DVD set. CD1 of the deluxe version features the original studio recordings with two previously unreleased songs, CD2 is a live version of all ER songs recorded at various stops on the Earth Rocker World Tour during the summer of 2013 and the DVD is a recording of Clutch's Denver, CO show from (11/14/13). As a bonus, the DVD contains three promotional videos, two of which were directed by Aisha Tyler.

Clutch released their 11th studio record, Psychic Warfare, on October 2, 2015 via Weathermaker Music. The first video from the album was "X-Ray Visions", Directed by Dan Winters. The album reached No. 11 on the Top 100 Billboard chart and No. 1 on both the Hard Rock and Rock Billboard charts. The second video from "Psychic Warfare" was "A Quick Death in Texas", directed and shot by My Good Eye ( David Brodsky/ Allison Woest). Clutch also participated in "10 Bands 1 Cause" breast cancer awareness program with a limited edition pink vinyl offering released September 18, 2015 distributed via RED.  This vinyl will be reissued by Weathermaker Music on black vinyl on October 7, 2016.

On April 16, 2016, Weathermaker Music will release a Clutch special limited edition 12" vinyl release for Record Store Day. The album will contain two previously unreleased tracks from the Psychic Warfare sessions: "Mad Sidewinder" and "Outland Special Clearance". These two tracks, specifically mastered for this vinyl configuration by Paul Logus, will be on side A. The reverse side will have a large scale etching taken from the Psychic Warfare CD booklet design created by Dan Winters. The jacket is hand numbered thick clear plastic showing the full art design, thus making this piece for Record Store Day 2016 a unique collectors' item for all Clutch fans.

On September 7, 2018, WeatherMaker Music released the 12th Clutch album, Book of Bad Decisions. The album charted No. 1 on the Billboard Hard Rock Charts and came in at No. 16 on the Billboard top 200.

In early 2019, Weathermaker Music will release a complete box set of the full Clutch catalogue on vinyl.

Weathermaker Music has signed distribution agreements with The Orchard in North America, as well as international distribution agreements with Rough Trade Distribution in Europe, including the UK, and Rocket Distribution in Australia.

Weathermaker Music Label Manager is Stefan Koster.

External links
 Official website

American record labels
Record labels established in 2008